Hughes Hubbard & Reed LLP (a.k.a. "Hughes Hubbard" or "HHR") is a multinational law firm headquartered in New York City with offices in the United States, France, and Japan. 

The firm's history dates back to the late 19th century, when it counted among its partners former U.S. Supreme Court Chief Justice Charles Evans Hughes.

Hughes Hubbard has several practise areas in both the litigation and corporate fields.

History

 1871 - In the wake of the Great Chicago Fire, Chicago-based lawyer Walter S. Carter had so many claims to prosecute involving insurers bankrupted by the fire that he moved his office to New York City.  Faced with more business than he could personally handle, Carter tried hiring the most promising law students to help him and, in a departure from standard practice, paid these "associates" a salary.  One of them was then-future Chief Justice of the Supreme Court Charles Evans Hughes.
 1888 - Four years after joining the firm, then known as Chamberlain, Carter & Hornblower, Hughes was made partner, and the firm's name was changed to Carter, Hughes & Cravath. 
 1910 - After two terms as governor of New York, Hughes was appointed to the Supreme Court by President William Howard Taft.
 1916 - Hughes resigned from the Court to run for president against Woodrow Wilson. After he was narrowly defeated, Hughes rejoined his old partners and, with the exception of the time he served as Secretary of State under Presidents Harding and Coolidge, he remained a partner in the firm until 1930.
 1929 - Charles Evans Hughes, Jr., also a partner in the firm, resigned to become United States Solicitor General.
 1930 - Hughes was appointed Chief Justice of the United States Supreme Court. Upon his father's appointment, Charles Evans Hughes, Jr. resigned from his position as Solicitor General and rejoined the firm as a partner.
 1937 - In June, the firm suddenly dissolved, due to what the media at the time reported was Charles Evans Hughes, Jr.'s desire to insulate his father from a political attack directed at one of Hughes, Jr.'s partners at the firm by Roosevelt's Secretary of the Treasury.  On June 10 of that year, Hughes, Richards, Hubbard & Ewing opened its offices at One Wall Street, where it would remain for over 50 years.
 In the 1960s, Hughes Hubbard started representing Coopers & Lybrand, culminating in its multibillion-dollar merger with Price Waterhouse. Other clients who have remained with the firm over multiple decades include Merck, BMI, Continental Airlines (now United) and Viacom. 
 1966 - Hughes Hubbard became one of the first American firms to open an office in Paris. The office was opened by Axel H. Baum, who is still working there.
 1968 - The firm became Hughes Hubbard & Reed. 
 1972 - Hughes Hubbard opened offices in Washington, D.C. and Los Angeles, becoming the first New York law firm to open an office in L.A.
 In the 1970s, Hughes Hubbard defended Bristol Myers in a famous antitrust case and Ford Motor Company in the Pinto fuel tank cases, which was the start of the firm's product liability practice. 
 1980 - The firm added a number of lateral partners to bolster its banking and financial services practices in New York.
 In the 1990s, Hughes Hubbard represented musician Bob Marley's widow against 11 people who alleged they were Marley's children and sought recovery from his substantial estate. 
 1999 - The firm elected Candace Beinecke as Chair of the Firm, making her the first woman to lead a major New York City law firm.
 2007 - Hughes Hubbard led the drafting of a historic $4.85 billion global settlement program to resolve over 99.9 percent of eligible Vioxx claims against Merck alleging heart attacks, ischemic strokes and sudden cardiac death.
 2008 - Hughes Hubbard partner James Giddens was appointed trustee for the $123 billion liquidation of Lehman Brothers, Inc., the largest bankruptcy in U.S. history, and Hughes Hubbard was selected as his counsel. In the following years, Hughes Hubbard returned $110 billion to customers and general creditors. 
 2011 - Hughes Hubbard partner James Giddens was appointed trustee for the liquidation of MF Global, the eighth-largest bankruptcy in U.S. history, and Hughes Hubbard was selected as his counsel. In the following years, Hughes Hubbard distributed $8.1 billion and achieved a full recovery for former customers and secured creditors and a 95 percent recovery for unsecured creditors. 
 2012 - Hughes Hubbard opened an office in Kansas City.
 2014 - Hughes Hubbard served as lead counsel to Merck in its acquisition of antibiotics maker Cubist Pharmaceuticals Inc. for $9.5 billion.
 2015 - Hughes Hubbard represented Merck in a $3.85 billion deal to buy Idenix Pharmaceuticals, Inc., a biotechnology company developing drugs to cure hepatitis C.
 2020 - Hughes Hubbard & Reed launched a CARES Act tracker that monitors enforcement actions across the United States.

Notable People and Alumni/ae
Ken Chen, Director of the Asian American Writers Workshop
George Davidson former President of the Legal Aid Society
Oscar R. Ewing, vice chairman of the Democratic National Committee (1942-1947), administrator of the Federal Security Agency (1947-1953), and adviser to President Harry S Truman
Charles Evans Hughes, Governor of New York (1907–1910), Associate Justice of the Supreme Court of the United States (1910–1916), United States Secretary of State (1921–1925) and Chief Justice of the United States (1930–1941)
Charles Evans Hughes, Jr., United States Solicitor General (1929–1930)
Amalya Lyle Kearse, Judge on the United States Court of Appeals for the Second Circuit (1979–present)
Howard Matz, judge on the United States District Court for the Central District of California (1998–present)
Abraham David Sofaer, federal judge for the United States District Court for the Southern District of New York, and then a legal adviser to the United States State Department, before joining firm 1990-1994. He is currently a senior fellow at the Hoover Institution at Stanford University
Powell Pierpoint. General Counsel of the Army (1961-1963)
Mitchell Silk. Assistant Secretary of the Treasury during the Trump administration.
James W. Treffinger, former County Executive of Essex County, New Jersey
Tim Zagat, restaurant critic

References

Law firms based in New York City
Law firms established in 1888